Plantago albicans is a species of perennial herb in the family Plantaginaceae. They have a self-supporting growth form, simple, broad leaves and dry fruit. Individuals can grow to 0.3 m.

Sources

References 

albicans
Flora of Malta